The Arizona Wildcats women's golf is considered one of the best in all of women's collegiate golf, dating back to their first season in 1979. Since they have won three national championships in 1996, 2000, and 2018.  The Wildcat Women have also had four individual national champions with Susan Slaughter in (1990), Annika Sörenstam in (1991), Marisa Baena in (1996) and Jenna Daniels in (2000).

Members of the Wildcat Women's program have gone on to have huge amounts of success on the LPGA tour, led by 8-time LPGA Player of the Year Annika Sörenstam and 4-time LPGA Player of the Year Lorena Ochoa.  Sörenstam is regarded as one of the best female golfers in history. Before stepping away from competitive golf at the end of the 2008 season, she had won 90 international tournaments as a professional, making her the female golfer with the most wins to her name. She has won 72 official LPGA tournaments including ten majors and 18 other tournaments internationally, and she tops the LPGA's career money list with earnings of over $22 million—over $2 million ahead of her nearest rival while playing 187 fewer events. Since 2006, Sörenstam has held dual American and Swedish citizenship.  The winner of a record eight Player of the Year awards, and six Vare Trophies given to the LPGA player with the lowest seasonal scoring average, she is the only female golfer to shoot a 59 in competition. She holds various all-time scoring records including the lowest season scoring average: 68.6969 in 2004.  Representing Europe in the Solheim Cup on eight occasions between 1994 and 2007, Sörenstam was the event's all-time leading points earner until her record was surpassed by England's Laura Davies during the 2011 Solheim Cup. Sörenstam also was captain of the 2017 European Solheim Cup team.  In 2003, Sörenstam played in the Bank of America Colonial tournament to become the first woman to play in a PGA Tour event since 1945.  On 2 December 2020, she was appointed president of the International Golf Federation from 1 January 2021. On 7 January 2021, she received the Presidential Medal of Freedom from President Donald Trump.

Lorena Ochoa was the top-ranked female golfer in the world for 158 consecutive and total weeks (both are LPGA Tour records), from 23 April 2007 to her retirement on 2 May 2010, at the age of 28 years old. As the first Mexican golfer of either gender to be ranked number one in the world, she is considered the best Mexican golfer and the best Latin American female golfer of all time. Ochoa was inducted into the World Golf Hall of Fame in 2017.

Yearly Record
Source

Team Tournament Wins (82)
Source:

1982 – Lady Aztec Invitational
1983 – Wildcat Invitational
1988 – Washington Invitational
1988 – Dick McGuire Invitational
1988 – Edean Ihlanfeldt Invitational
1989 – Wildcat Invitational
1989 – Shiseido Cup International
1989 – Edean Ihlanfeldt Invitational
1990 – Border Conference Championship
1990 – Oregon Invitational
1991 – Stanford Invitational 
1991 – Wildcat Invitational
1991 – UCF Rotary Classic
1991 – Golfsmith Betsy Rawls Longhorn Invitational
1991 – Rainbow Wahine Invitational
1991 – Dick McGuire Invitational
1991 – Lady Sun Devil Invitational
1991 – Edean Ihlanfeldt Invitational 
1992 – Wildcat Invitational
1992 – Golfsmith Betsy Rawls Classic

1992 – Rainbow Wahine Invitational
1992 – Pac-10 Championships (1)
1996 – LSU Fairwood Invitational        
1996 – Rainbow Wahine Invitational
1996 – Buckeye Invitational
1996 – NCAA West Regional
1996 – NCAA Championships (1)
1996 – Dick McGuire Invitational
1996 – Rolex NCAA Preview
1997 – LSU Fairwood Invitational     
1997 – PING/ASU Invitational
1997 – Pac-10 Championships (2)
1997 – Rolex NCAA Preview
1998 – Pac-10 Championships (3)
1998 – NCAA West Regional
1998 – Stanford Intercollegiate
1998 – Golf World Invitational
1999 – Arizona Invitational
1999 – Rainbow Wahine Invitational
1999 – Dick McGuire Invitational

2000 –  Golf World Invitational
2000 – TRW Regional Challenge
2000 – Wildcat Invitational
2000 – Rainbow Wahine Invitational
2000 – PING/ASU Invitational
2000 – Pac-10 Championships (4)
2000 – NCAA West Regional
2000 – NCAA Championships (2)
2000 – Dick McGuire Invitational
2000 – Stanford Pepsi Invitational
2001 – TRW Regional Challenge
2001 – Wildcat Invitational
2001 – Pac-10 Championships (5)
2001 – NCAA West Regional
2002 – Pac-10 Championships (6)
2003 – Edean Ihlanfeldt Invitational
2010 – Las Vegas Collegiate Showdown
2010 – Pac-10 Championships (7)
2010 – NCAA West Regional
2010 – Topy Cup

2011 – Wildcat Invitational
2012 – Wildcat Invitational
2012 –  UNLV Invitational
2012 – Mason Rudolph Championship
2012 – Windy City Collegiate Classic
2013 – Dr. Donnis Thompson Invitational
2014 – SunTrust Gator Invitational
2015 – SunTrust Gator Invitational
2015 – PING/ASU Invitational
2015 – Pac-12 Championships (8)
2016 – Wildcat Invitational
2017 – Mountain View Collegiate
2018 – Hawkeye El Tigre Invitational
2018 – PING/ASU Invitational
2018 – NCAA Championships (3)
2019 – Pac-12 Preview
2019 – UNLV Rebel Beach Invitational 
2019 – Hawkeye El Tigre Invitational
2020 – Pac-12 Preview
2020 – Wildcat Invitational

Individual Champions
Source:

NCAA
Arizona has had 4 individuals claim the NCAA Individual Championship on 4 occasions.

Regional

Conference
Arizona has had 5 separate golfers win a conference title on 5 separate occasions.

National Honors
Source

NCAA Coach of the Year
1996 – Kim Haddow

Pac-10/12 Coach of the Year
1992 – Kim Haddow
1998 – Rick LaRose
2000 – Todd McCorkle
2010 – Laura Ianello
2019 – Laura Ianello (Co-COY)

US Women's Amateur Champions
1996 – Heather Graff (US Public Links)
1997 – Marisa Baena (Runner Up)
2000 – Laura Myercough (Runner Up)

National College Player of the Year
1991 – Annika Sörenstam (NGCA, Golfweek)
1996 – Marisa Baena (Honda Award, NGCA)
1997 – Marisa Baena (Honda Award, NGCA)
2000 – Jenna Daniels (Honda Award, NGCA)
2001 – Lorena Ochoa (NGCA)
2002 – Lorena Ochoa (NGCA)
2003 – Erica Blasberg (Golfweek Magazine)

Pac-10/12 Player of the Year
2003 – Erica Blasberg

National Freshman of the Year
2001 – Lorena Ochoa (WGCA)
2003 – Erica Blasberg (WGCA)
2020 – Vivian Hou (WGCA)

Pac-10/12 Freshman of the Year
2001 – Lorena Ochoa
2003 – Erica Blasberg

Curtis Cup
2002 – Laura Myerscough
2004 – Erica Blasberg

All-American (Selected by WGCA)
1988 – Martina Koch (2nd Team)
1989 – Martina Koch (2nd Team)
1990 – Mette Hageman (1st Team)
1990 – Martina Koch (1st Team)
1990 – Susan Slaughter (1st Team)
1991 – Mette Hageman (1st Team)
1991 – Annika Sörenstam (1st Team)
1991 – Leta Lindley (1st Team)
1992 – Annika Sörenstam (1st Team)
1992 – Debbie Parks (1st Team)
1992 – Leta Lindley (1st Team)
1994 – Leta Lindley (1st Team)
1996 – Marisa Baena (1st Team)
1996 – Heather Graff (2nd Team)
1997 – Marisa Baena (1st Team)
1998 – Marisa Baena (1st Team)
1998 – Jenna Daniels (2nd Team)
1998 – Krissie Register (2nd Team)
1999 – Jenna Daniels (2nd Team)
2000 – Cristina Baena (2nd Team)
2000 – Jenna Daniels (1st Team)
2001 – Lorena Ochoa (1st Team)
2001 – Natalie Gulbis (1st Team)
2002 – Lorena Ochoa (1st Team)
2003 – Erica Blasberg (1st Team)
2004 – Erica Blasberg (1st Team)
2007 – Alison Walshe (1st Team)
2008 – Alison Walshe (1st Team)
2010 – Margarita Ramos (2nd Team)
2011 – Isabelle Boineau (2nd Team)
2014 – Lindsey Weaver (2nd Team)
2015 – Lindsey Weaver (2nd Team)
2017 – Haley Moore (2nd Team)
2019 – Bianca Pagdanganan (2nd Team)
2019 – Yu-Sang Hou (2nd Team)
2020 – Vivian Hou (1st Team)
2020 – Yu-Sang Hou (2nd Team)
2021 – Yu-Sang Hou (2nd Team)

WGCA Academic All-American
1992 – Leta Lindley
1994 – Leta Lindley
1994 – Ulrika Johansson
1995 – Ulrika Johansson
1996 – Christina Tolerton 
1997 – Christina Tolerton 
1998 – Krissie Register
1998 – Jill Gomric
1999 – Krissie Register
1999 – Christina Monteiro
2000 – Christina Monteiro
2001 – Christina Monteiro
2002 – Cathie Williamson
2004 – Whitney Welch
2004 – Lani Elston 
2005 – Whitney Welch
2005 – Lani Elston 
2006 – Whitney Welch
2009 – Nikki Koller
2009 – Margarita Ramos
2010 – Nikki Koller
2013 – Kendall Prince
2014 – Kendall Prince
2014 – Jessica Vasilic
2014 – Andrea Vilarasau
2014 – Wanasa Zhou
2015 – Kendall Prince
2015 – Wanasa Zhou
2016 – Jessica Vasilic
2016 – Wanasa Zhou
2017 – Jessica Vasilic
2017 – Wanasa Zhou
2018 – Sandra Nordaas 
2019 – Ya Chun Chang
2019 – Sandra Nordaas
2020 – Ya Chun Chang
2020 – Vivian Hou
2020 – Gile Bite Starkute
2020 – Therese Warner
2021 – Ya Chun Chang
2021 – Maya Benita
2021 – Gile Bite Starkute
2021 – Therese Warner

Team Scoring Records
Source:

Individual Scoring Record

References

College golf teams in the United States
University of Arizona
Women's sports in Arizona